Desi Daaru, also known as Country Liquor or Indian-made Indian liquor (IMIL) is a category of liquor made in the countryside of the Indian subcontinent. They are traditionally prepared by a procedure that has been passed down for centuries. Due to cheap prices, country liquor is the most popular alcoholic beverage among the impoverished people. It is fermented and distilled from molasses, a by product of sugarcane. Desi liquor is a broad term and it can include both legally and illegally made local alcohol. The term desi daru usually refers to legal alcohol while other types of country liquor (arrack and palm toddy) may be categorised as moonshine alcohol.

Etymology

The term desi, from Hindi language term desh (country or region), which is generally an endonym for the compatriot or local is often applied to food or drink that is considered traditional or native. Dārū (Hindi दारू and Urdu دارو) is a Persian-derived term used for any alcoholic beverage in India. Śarāb (Hindi शराब and Urdu شراب) is another Persian-derived equivalent and is used in some areas with less frequency.

Industry

An article in the medical journal The Lancet estimated that nearly two-thirds of the alcohol consumed in India is country liquor. Globus spirits mentioned that India's country liquor market is about 242 million cases (over 30% of the beverage industry in India) with a growth rate of about 7% per annum. No data regarding Pakistan is available as drinking alcohol is officially prohibited for Muslims in Pakistan, although locally made liquor is sold on the black market.

Government regulation provide for a separate licensing for production, distribution and retailing of country liquor (IMIL) as opposed to Indian-made foreign liquor.

Social issues

Country liquor, being the cheapest alcohol in India, is the mainstay alcoholic beverage for the rural population and urban poor. In rural areas, illicit country liquor has been blamed for domestic violence and poverty in the family. There have been several protests against country liquor shops/bars in villages.

Adulteration 
As country liquor is cheaper than other spirits, there have been reports of mixing country liquor with Scotch/English whisky in many bars in India.

If care is not taken in the distillation process and the proper equipment is not used, harmful impurities such as fusel alcohols, lead from plumbing solder, and methanol can be concentrated to toxic levels. Several deaths have been reported in India and Pakistan due to consumption of non-factory made toxic liquor.

In popular culture
There are several references of desi daru in Bollywood films, songs.

2012 film Cocktail has song named Daru Desi sung by Benny Dayal and Shalmali Kholgade.
2011 film F.A.L.T.U has party song named Char Baj Gaye (Party Abhi Baaki Hai) has reference of desi daru.
Scenes in 2011 film Rockstar shows lead actor Ranbir Kapoor and lead actress Nargis Fakhri drinking desi daru.
2014 film Main Aur Mr. Riight has song named Desi Daru sung by Jasbir Jassi.

See also

 Alcoholic Indian beverages
 Beer in India 
 Indian-made foreign liquor
 Indian whisky
 Lion beer, Asia's first beer brand
 Solan No. 1, India's first malt whisky
 Old Monk, iconic Indian rum
 Sura
 Other India alcohol related
 Alcohol laws of India
 Alcohol prohibition in India
 Dry Days in India

References

External links

 Photo of Desi daru by ''Firstpost

Indian alcoholic drinks
Indian distilled drinks
Desi cuisine
Desi culture
Traditional Indian alcoholic beverages
Adulteration